Sphenarches bilineatus is a moth of the family Pterophoridae that is known from Samoa.

References

Exterlal links

Platyptiliini
Moths described in 1963
Endemic fauna of Samoa
Moths of Oceania